Rear Admiral Joan Marie Engel (born December 9, 1940) held the position as the 18th Director of the Navy Nurse Corps from September 1994 to August 1998. She concurrently served as deputy commander for personnel management in the Health Sciences, Education and Training Command, and later as assistant chief for Education, Training and Personnel.

Early life
Rear Adm. Engel was born in St. Marys, Pennsylvania in 1940. She was the first school nurse at Elk County Christian High School.

Navy Nurse Corps Career
Engel entered the Navy Nurse Corps in 1969 as a lieutenant. She served in various stateside and overseas naval hospitals, progressing in rank with jobs of increasing responsibility.  She became deputy director of the Nurse Corps, serving under the RADM Mariann Stratton, the 17th Navy Nurse Corps director.

Clinical nursing assignments included assignments at the Naval Hospital, Millington, TN; Branch Medical Clinic, Iwakuni, Japan; Branch Medical Clinic, LaMaddalena, Sardinia; and Naval Hospitals in Charleston, SC, Jacksonville, FL, Newport, RI, and Pensacola, FL.

Engel's administrative assignments included being the first junior Nurse Detailer, BUMED; the first Assistant Chief of Staff, Logistics, Naval Medical Command, Northeast Region, Great Lakes, IL; Naval Inspector General staff, Washington, D.C., and Naval Medical Inspector General staff, BUMED; and Deputy Director, Navy Nurse Corps, BUMED.

She served as the 18th Director, Navy Nurse Corps from October 1994 until August 1998.

Rear Admiral Engel retired in January 2000 as the Assistant Chief, Operational Medicine and Fleet Support, Bureau of Medicine and Surgery, Washington, DC, a position she held since August 1996.

Education
RADM Engel received her nursing diploma from the Mercy Hospital School of Nursing in Buffalo, New York in 1961. She earned a bachelor's degree in public school nursing from Clarion University in Pennsylvania in 1969. In 1980, she earned a Master of Science in nursing from the University of Alabama School of Nursing. She is a Fellow in the American Academy of Nursing, a Wharton Fellow and holds an honorary fellowship in the American Academy of Medical Administrators.

Awards
Engel has earned the Legion of Merit (two awards), the Meritorious Service Medal (four awards), the Navy Commendation Medal (two awards), and the National Defense Medal with bronze star.  In 1998, the Clarion University Alumni Association presented her with the Distinguished Alumni Award.

  Legion of Merit with Gold Star
  Meritorious Service Medal with three Gold Stars
  Navy and Marine Corps Commendation Medal with Gold Star
  National Defense Service Medal with bronze star

See also
 Navy Nurse Corps
 Women in the United States Navy

References

Further reading
 
  Fact filled, extensively researched account of the evolution of the roles of women in the United States Navy, treating the parallel and entertwined paths of the Navy Nurse Corps and the WAVES. About one-third of the pages are devoted to notes and bibliography.

External links
Nurses and the U.S. Navy -- Overview and Special Image Selection Naval Historical Center
Joan Micah Engel

1940 births
Living people
People from St. Marys, Pennsylvania
United States Navy Nurse Corps officers
Clarion University of Pennsylvania alumni
University of Alabama alumni
United States Navy rear admirals
Female admirals of the United States Navy
Fellows of the American Academy of Nursing
Recipients of the Legion of Merit
American nursing administrators
21st-century American women
Military personnel from Pennsylvania